Nick Yallouris (born 24 February 1994) is an Australian track cyclist. He represented Australia in the 2016 Rio Paralympics as a sighted pilot for Australian cycling Paralympian, Matthew Formston.

Personal
Yallouris was born on 24 February 1974 in Gosford, New South Wales. Yallouris currently resides in Chittaway Point on the NSW Central Coast. He is a Bicycle mechanic by trade.

Career
Yallouris has had a passion for bicycles since a young age. He is from a BMX background and was introduced to track cycling in 2010. In 2015, he won the madison and came third in the elite scratch race and elite time trial at the 2015 Australian National Track Championships. Yallouris was then selected to join the Australian Paralympic Cycling Team. His debut for Australia in the Para-cycling team was at the 2015 UCI Para-cycling Track World Championships in the Netherlands where he paired up with Commonwealth Games medallist Paul Kennedy. They finished sixth with a time of (1:04.274). At the Rio Paralympics, Yallouris will be the pilot for Formston. They train up to 13 times per week.

Recognition
2012 - Central Coast Cyclist of the Year

References

External links

NSWIS Cycling team profile
We Believe - Matt Formston and Nick Yallouris

1974 births
Living people
Paralympic cyclists of Australia
Cyclists at the 2016 Summer Paralympics
Australian male cyclists
Sportsmen from New South Wales
UCI Track Cycling World Champions (men)
Australian track cyclists
20th-century Australian people
21st-century Australian people